The 2022 PSA Men's World Squash Championship was the 2022 men's edition of the World Squash Championships, which served as the individual world championship for squash players. The event took place in Cairo, Egypt from 13 to 22 May 2022. It was the fifth time that Cairo host the PSA World Championships after 1985, 1999, 2006 & 2016 editions.

World ranking points/prize money
PSA also awards points towards World ranking. Points are awarded as follows:

Prize money breakdown
Total prize money for the tournament is $1,100,000, $550,000 per gender. This is about a 9% prize fund increase from previous World Championships (2020–21; $500,000 per gender).

Seeds

  Paul Coll (semi finals)
  Ali Farag  (champion) 
  Mohamed El Shorbagy (finals)
  Mostafa Asal (semi finals)
  Diego Elías (quarter finals)
  Tarek Momen (quarter finals)
  Marwan El Shorbagy (quarter finals)
  Fares Dessouky (quarter finals)

  Joel Makin (third round)
  Mazen Hesham (third round)
  Youssef Ibrahim (third round)
  Karim Abdel Gawad (third round)
  Grégoire Marche (third round)
  Miguel Ángel Rodríguez (first round)
  Youssef Soliman (third round)
  Saurav Ghosal (third round)

Draw and results

Key
 rtd. = Retired
 Q = Qualifier
 WC = Host wild card
 I =  invitee
 w/o = Walkover

Finals

Top half

Section 1

Section 2

Bottom half

Section 3

Section 4

Schedule
Times are Egypt Standard Time (UTC+02:00). To the best of five games.

Round 1

——————————————————————————————————————————————————————————————————————————————————————————————————————————

Round 2

Round 3

Quarter-finals

Semi-finals

Final

Representation
This table shows the number of players by country in the 2022 PSA Men's World Championship. A total of 19 nationalities are represented. Egypt is the most represented nation with 20 players.

See also
 World Squash Championships
 2022 PSA Women's World Squash Championship

References

World Squash Championships
Men's World Squash Championship
Squash tournaments in Egypt
International sports competitions hosted by Egypt
PSA Men's World Squash Championship
PSA